The 2009 FIBA Africa Championship for Women is the 19th continental championships held by FIBA Africa. The championship will serve as a qualifying tournament for the 2010 FIBA World Championship for Women in the Czech Republic. The tournament took place at the Palais des Sports, Antananarivo, Madagascar from October 9 to October 18.  Senegal defeated Mali in the final to capture its tenth FIBA Africa Championship for Women.  Both teams qualified for the 2010 FIBA World Championship for Women.

Squads

Draw

Preliminary round

Group A

Group B

Knockout stage

Championship bracket

Quarterfinals

Semifinals

3rd place match

Final

5th place bracket

Classification 5-8

7th place match

5th place match

9th place bracket

Classification 9-12

11th place match

9th place match

Final standings

Senegal rosterAwa Gueye, Aya Traoré, Aminata Dieye, Aminata Nar Diop, Bineta Diouf, Fatou Dieng, Fatou Thiam, Fatoumata Diango, Mame Diodio Diouf, Mame Marie Sy, Ndèye Sène, Oumoul Sarr, Coach:

Awards

All-Tournament Team 
  Aya Traoré
  Nacissela Maurício
  Fatou Dieng
  Aminata Nar Diop
  Naignouma Coulibaly

Statistical Leaders

Individual Tournament Highs

Points

Rebounds

Assists

Steals

Blocks

Minutes

Individual Game Highs

Team Tournament Highs

Points per Game

Rebounds

Assists

Steals

Blocks

Fouls

2-point field goal percentage

3-point field goal percentage

Free throw percentage

Team Game highs

See also
 2009 FIBA Africa Women's Clubs Champions Cup

External links
Championship page at FIBA Africa
Fixtures

2009
FIBA Africa Championship for Women
FIBA Africa Championship for Women
FIBA Africa Championship for Women
International basketball competitions hosted by Madagascar